Mr. Perfect may refer to:

Curt Hennig (1958–2003), American wrestler who used the name "Mr. Perfect" in the ring
Jerry Stubbs (born 1952), American wrestler who used the name "Mr. Perfect" in the ring
Ernesto Hoost (born 1965), Dutch kickboxer who used the name "Mr. Perfect" in the ring
Mr. Perfect (film), a 2011 Indian film
"Mr. Perfect" (song), a 2011 song by Greek-Swedish singer Elena Paparizou
Mr. Perfect, a song from Arya 2
Mr. Perfect (Mr. Men), a character from the Mr. Men book and animation series